Bulbul Chowdhury (14 August 1947 – 28 August 2021) was a Bangladeshi novelist and writer. He was awarded the Ekushey Padak in 2021 in recognition of his contribution to the language and literature of Bangladesh.

Early life 
Chowdhury was born on 16 August 1948 in the village of Dakshinbagh, Gazipur District, East Bengal, British Raj. Besides writing, he was also involved in journalism and worked with several newspapers.

Literary works

 Aparup Beel Jheel Nadi
 Kahakamini
 Tiyaser Lekhan
  Achine Anchari
 Maram Bakhani
  Ei Ghore Lakshi Thake
 Itu Boudir Ghor
 Dakhina Bao
 Gaogeramer Galpagatha
 Prachin Gitikar Golpo
 Jiboner Ankibnuki ( Autobiography)
 Atoler Kathakatha ( Autobiography)

Awards

 Ekushey Padak
 Bangla Academy Literary Award
 Humayun Qadir Smriti Purashkar
 Jasimuddin Smriti Puraskar

References 

 
1947 births
2021 deaths
People from Gazipur District
Recipients of the Ekushey Padak
Bangladeshi male novelists